National Secondary Route 142, or just Route 142 (or ) is a National Road Route of Costa Rica, located in the Alajuela, Guanacaste provinces.

Description
In Alajuela province the route covers San Carlos canton (La Fortuna district).

In Guanacaste province the route covers Cañas canton (Cañas district), Tilarán canton (Tilarán, Santa Rosa, Tierras Morenas, Arenal districts).

References

Highways in Costa Rica